Guillermo Díez-Canedo Fernández (born 11 November 1982 in Madrid) is a Spanish slalom canoeist who has competed since the late 1990s.

He won a bronze medal in the K-1 team event at the 2009 ICF Canoe Slalom World Championships in La Seu d'Urgell. At the 2008 Summer Olympics in Beijing, he was eliminated in the semifinals of the K-1 event.

References
Sports-Reference.com profile
Overview of athlete's results at canoeslalom.net

1983 births
Canoeists at the 2008 Summer Olympics
Living people
Olympic canoeists of Spain
Spanish male canoeists
Medalists at the ICF Canoe Slalom World Championships
21st-century Spanish people